Robert Teichmüller (4 May 1863, in Braunschweig – 6 May 1939, in Leipzig) was a German concert pianist and music educator.

He studied piano and music theory with Carl Reinecke at the Leipzig Conservatory where he later became a faculty member in 1897, promoted to professor in 1908. He became one of the most influential piano teachers of his time. His students included notable pianists Günther Ramin, Sigfrid Karg-Elert, Siegfried Rapp, Harry Dean, Kurt Hessenberg, Eileen Joyce, Rudolf Wagner-Régeny, Herbert Albert, Rudolf Mauersberger, Elinor Kaland (maiden name Loose), Leonard Shepherd Munn and Ernst Oster, who became a music theory teacher. He also edited piano music of Mozart and Max Reger. In 1927 he wrote an ongoing survey of "International Modern Piano Music" with Kurt Hermann.


References

Literature

In German
 Baresel, Alfred: Robert Teichmüller und die Leipziger Klaviertradition. Peters, Leipzig 1934.
 Baresel, Alfred (ed.): Robert Teichmüller als Mensch und Künstler. Leipzig 1922.
 Jarck, Horst-Rüdiger & Scheel, Günter (eds.): Braunschweigisches Biographisches Lexikon. 19. und 20. Jahrhundert. Hannover 1996, S. 606

In English
 VanWart, Helen: Letters from Helen. Sybertooth. Sackville, New Brunswick 2010.  [Letters from a student of Teichmüller, from 1913–14.]

External links
 Photo of Teichmüller 
 Full text (English) of International Piano Music, 1927

1863 births
1939 deaths
Academic staff of the University of Music and Theatre Leipzig
19th-century German pianists
German music educators
Piano pedagogues
20th-century German pianists